Take No Prisoners is the debut solo album of British rock singer David Byron. It was released while he was still vocalist for Uriah Heep, and features Heep bandmates Mick Box and Lee Kerslake, as well as Ken Hensley and John Wetton on select tracks.

Track listing
 

 Sides one and two were combined as tracks 1–10 on CD reissues.

Personnel

David Byron – voice, producer
Mick Box – guitars
Lou Stonebridge – keyboards
Denny Ball – bass
Lee Kerslake – drums
 Pete Thompson – drums (tracks: 2–4, 6)
Ken Hensley – acoustic guitar (track 10)
 John Wetton – mellotron (tracks: 1, 5)
Chanter Sisters – backing vocals
Martha Smith – backing vocals
Neil Lancaster – backing vocals
Chas Mills – backing vocals
Russ Stone – backing vocals
Peter Gallen and David Byron
Technical
Ashley Howe – engineer
Dave Harris – assistant engineer
Trevor Hallesy – assistant engineer
John Gallen – assistant engineer
Dell Roll – equipment
 Pete Gibbs – equipment

References

David Byron albums
1975 debut albums
Bronze Records albums
Repertoire Records albums
Albums recorded at Morgan Sound Studios
Mercury Records albums